Gallocatechol or gallocatechin (GC) is a flavan-3-ol, a type of chemical compound including catechin, with the gallate residue being in an isomeric trans position.

This compound possesses two epimers. The most common, (+)-gallocatechin (GC), CAS number 970-73-0, is found notably in green tea. The other enantiomer is called (-)-gallocatechin or ent-gallocatechin. It was first isolated from green tea by Michiyo Tsujimura in 1934.

Epigallocatechin is another type of catechin, with the gallate residue being in an isomeric cis position. It can be found in St John's wort.

See also 
 Epigallocatechin gallate
 Prodelphinidin
 List of phytochemicals in food

References

External links 
 Epigallocatechin on the Sigma-Aldrich website
 Gallocatechin on the Sigma-Aldrich website

Flavanols
CB1 receptor agonists
GABAA receptor positive allosteric modulators
GHB receptor agonists